Veruela, officially the Municipality of Veruela,  is a 2nd class municipality in the province of Agusan del Sur, Philippines. According to the 2020 census, it has a population of 39,708 people.

History
Veruela is considered the oldest town of upper Agusan del Sur. It was believed the name "Veruela" was derived from the word "virus", as the entire area was suffering from smallpox and cholera in the late 18th century when the Spanish missionaries encountered the tribe. From then on, the name Veruela existed out of the Spanish word La Verus.

The Manobo tribes later moved to Manning, also known as Linongsuran along the Agusan River. In 1916 however, a great earthquake destroyed the settlement leaving no trace of it, forcing the survivors to evacuate and reorganize themselves into another place, now the barangay poblacion of the municipality.

In the 18th century, the Muslim tribes in Davao invaded the Manobos in Agusan. The Manobos fought against the Muslims. The first known leader of the inhabitants was Eladio Manguyod, a strong and influential datu of the Manobo tribe, who led his people to victory after a hard-fought battle that drove the Muslims out of Agusan. It was also during those times when the tribe was converted into Christianity. The inhabitants owed their victories to Datu Manguyod as well as their patron, Saint John.

Veruela became a municipality through Executive Order No. 147 proclaimed by President Diosdado Macapagal on March 31, 1965 during the term of Congressman Guillermo Sanchez, who once also served as mayor of the town. Since its formal creation as a municipality, Veruela had undergone a series of eight different administrations.

The municipality of Veruela has a silent dispute with the nearby province of Compostela Valley regarding the boundary between the two in Barangay Del Monte. The local governments are trying to solve the issue amicably.

Geography

According to the Philippine Statistics Authority, the municipality has a land area of  constituting  of the  total area of Agusan del Sur.

Climate

Barangays
Veruela is politically subdivided into 20 barangays.

Demographics

In the 2020 census, Veruela had a population of 39,708.

Economy

References

External links
 [ Philippine Standard Geographic Code]

Municipalities of Agusan del Sur
Establishments by Philippine executive order